Ferreolus may refer to:

Tonantius Ferreolus (disambiguation), several meanings
Ferréol of Grenoble, Ferjus of Grenoble, Catholic saint
Ferréol of Uzès, Catholic saint
Ferreolus and Ferrutio, martyrs and saints

See also
Saint Ferreolus (disambiguation)